Bill Gilbert was an English speedway rider.

Speedway career 
Gilbert was a leading speedway rider in the late 1940s. He reached the final of the Speedway World Championship in the 1949 Individual Speedway World Championship.

He rode in the top tier of British Speedway, riding for Wembley Lions. He initially retired from speedway in 1951, but did return in 1952 for the Norwich Stars.

World Final appearances

 1949 -  London, Wembley Stadium - 11th - 6pts

References 

British speedway riders
Wembley Lions riders
Norwich Stars riders
Possibly living people
Year of birth missing